William S. Bartman (October 14, 1946 – September 15, 2005) was an American art patron, and founder of Art Resources Transfer.

Life
He was born in Chicago, and grew up in Los Angeles.

References

External links
http://www.aaa.si.edu/collections/oral-history-interview-william-s-bartman-13664

1946 births
2005 deaths